"Lonely Is the Night" is a 1981 song by Billy Squier.

Lonely Is the Night may also refer to:

"Lonely Is the Night" (Air Supply song), 1986 song by Air Supply
Lonely Is the Night, 1990 album by Lory Bianco

See also
Lonely Nights (disambiguation)